The 1974 World Sambo Championships were held in Ulaanbaatar, Mongolia on September 6–11. It was the second World Sambo Championships.

Medal overview

References

World Sambo Championships
International sports competitions hosted by Mongolia
Sport in Ulaanbaatar
World Sambo Championships
World Sambo Championships, 1974
World Championships
World Sambo Championships